Steve Lyons may refer to:
 Steve Lyons (writer), British writer
 Steve Lyons (baseball) (born 1960), baseball player and baseball announcer/analyst
 Steve Lyons (rugby league), rugby league footballer of the 1970s, and 1980s

See also
Steve Lyon (born 1952), ice hockey player